Sadovy or Sadovyi (masculine), Sadovaya (feminine), or Sadovoye (neuter) may refer to:

People 
 Liza Sadovy, British actress
 Sadovyi (surname)

Places 
 Sadovy, Giaginsky District, Republic of Adygea, Russia
 Sadovy, Krasnooktyabrskoye Rural Settlement, Maykopsky District, Republic of Adygea, Russia
 Sadovy, Timiryazevskoye Rural Settlement, Maykopsky District, Republic of Adygea, Russia
 Sadovy, Astrakhan Oblast, Russia
 Sadovaya, Khabarovsk Krai, a village in Khabarovsk Krai, Russia
 Sadovoye, Astrakhan Oblast, Russia
 Sadovoye, Republic of Adygea, Russia
 Sadovoye, Republic of Kalmykia, Russia
 Sadovy, Krasnodolinsky Selsoviet, Kastorensky District, Kursk Oblast, Russia
 Sadovy, Semyonovsky Selsoviet, Kastorensky District, Kursk Oblast, Russia
 Sadovy, Amosovsky Selsoviet, Medvensky District, Kursk Oblast, Russia
 Sadovy, Nizhnereutchansky Selsoviet, Medvensky District, Kursk Oblast, Russia
 Sadovy, Rylsky District, Kursk Oblast, Russia
 Sadovy, Sovetsky District, Kursk Oblast, Russia
 Sadovoye, Kyrgyzstan, Chuy Region, Kyrgyzstan

See also
 
 
Sadovaya Street, a major thoroughfare in Central Saint Petersburg, Russia
Garden Ring (Sadovoye koltso), a ring road in Moscow
Sadovaya (Saint Petersburg Metro), a station of Saint Petersburg Metro, Saint Petersburg, Russia